

H-Net ("Humanities & Social Sciences Online") is an interdisciplinary forum for scholars in the humanities and social sciences. It is best known for hosting  electronic mailing lists organized by academic disciplines; according to the organization's website, H-Net lists reach over 200,000 subscribers in more than 90 countries.

The H-Net Network has grown until it is now endorsed by many academic professional organizations. Its over 180 topic- or discipline-specific lists are often the primary internet forum for scholars.  Individual lists are edited by a team of scholars and each has a board of editors. H-Net is hosted by the Department of History at Michigan State University.

Online services 
In addition to its email lists, H-Net provides three related online services:
H-Net Reviews: 46,000+ reviews of books and other publications, commissioned and published on its website and through its listservs
H-Net Job Guide: academic position announcements, available on its website and through email
H-Net Academic Announcements: announcements of academic conferences, calls for papers, and programs

Discussion networks
Many of the lists deal with various areas of historical study. Within two years of its founding, H-Net was recognized as being "among the most dynamic and effective contributions" to the internationalization of scholarship.

History
H-Net began in 1992 as an initiative of Prof. Richard J. Jensen of the History department at the University of Illinois at Chicago, to assist historians "to easily communicate current research and teaching interests; to discuss new approaches, methods and tools of analysis; to share information on access to library catalogs and other electronic databases; and to test new ideas and share comments on current historiography." H-Net is now organized as an international consortium of scholars in the humanities and social sciences and its networks are hosted by Michigan State University.

In 2010, the H-Net president is historian Jean A. Stuntz of West Texas A&M University.

See also
 hprints, an open access repository for Nordic academic research in the arts and humanities

Notes

References

 Matthew Gilmore, "H-Net: Digital Discussion for Historians", Perspectives: The Newsletter of the American Historical Association, 45: 5 (May 2007).
 Richard J. Jensen, "Internet's Republic of Letters: H-Net for Scholars", (1997). A discussion of H-Net and its origins from the perspective of the founder.
 Mark Lawrence Kornbluh, "H-Net: Humanities and Social Sciences OnLine," Perspectives: The Newsletter of the American Historical Association, 37: 2 (February 1999).
 Joel D. Kitchens, "Clio on the Web: An Annotated Bibliography of Select E-Journals for History," Perspectives: The Newsletter of the American Historical Association, 38: 2 (Feb. 2000).
 John McClymer, The AHA Guide to Teaching and Learning with New Media, (Washington: The American Historical Association), 2005.
 Andrew McMichael, "The Historian, the Internet, and the Web: A Reassessment," Perspectives: The Newsletter of the American Historical Association, 36: 2 (Feb. 1998).
 Jeremy D. Popkin, From Herodotus to H-Net: The Story of Historiography  (Oxford UP, 2015).

External links
 H-Net Commons
 H-Net: Humanities and Social Sciences Online

Tertiary educational websites
Digital humanities
Social sciences organizations
Electronic mailing lists
Internet properties established in 1992